The 1994–95 English Hockey League season took place from October 1994 until April 1995.

The Men's National League won by Teddington and the Women's National League was won by Slough.

The Men's Hockey Association Cup was won by Guildford and the AEWHA Cup was won by Hightown.

Men's National League First Division League Standings

Women's National League Premier Division League Standings

Men's Cup (Hockey Association Cup)

Quarter-finals

Semi-finals

Final 
(Held at Canterbury on 28 May)

Guildford
Kevin Priday, Stuart Matton, Tony Robertson, Julian Barker, Ian Jennings, Hamish Ferguson, Graham Cartmell, Mark Morris, Danny Hall, Rob Bilsland, Richard Markham Subs Neil Powell, C Burnell 
Teddington
Garry Meredith, Paul Way, Phil McGuire, Simon Nicklin, Tony Colclough, Renwick Irvine, Jimmy Wallis, Tyrone Moore, Peter Gibbins, Jason Laslett, Andy Billson subs Neil D'Mello, Mark Sully

Women's Cup (AEWHA Cup)

Quarter-finals

Semi-finals

Final 
(Held at Milton Keynes Sports Club on 21 May)

Hightown
Carolyn Reid, Jackie Crook, Julie Aspin, Chris Cook, Lorraine Marsden (capt), Fiona Lee, Maggie Souyave, Linda Carr, Michaela Morton, Lucy Newcombe, Tina Cullen subs Caroline Gilbert, T Mawdsley, Donna Mills
Trojans
Julie Williams, K Smith, Lisa Copeland, S Hibberd, E Teague, J Moss, Sally Gibson, A Wakefield, M Sutter, Kathryn James, C Manchester Subs S Strange, J Greenham

References 

1994
field hockey
field hockey
1994 in field hockey
1995 in field hockey